Milton Bland (October 3, 1930 – July 3, 1986) better known as Monk Higgins, was an American musician and saxophonist who was born in Menifee, Arkansas.

Biography
Higgins's biggest hits were the instrumental tracks "Who Dun It" (which reached #30 on the US R&B chart in 1966), and "Gotta Be Funky" (#22 on the US R&B chart). His instrumental "Ceatrix Did It" (1967) was the sign-off song for soul DJ Dr Rock on WMPP, East Chicago Heights, Illinois.  Higgins worked with a variety of musicians including Gene Harris,  Bobby Bland, The Chi-Lites, Junior Wells, Freddy Robinson, Muddy Waters, Cash McCall, Etta James, Blue Mitchell and The Three Sounds. His track "One Man Band (Plays All Alone)" was featured on the breakbeat compilation album, Ultimate Breaks and Beats.

Late in his career, Higgins performed with his band The Specialties as the featured artists at the television actress Marla Gibbs's Los Angeles, California supper club, known as Marla's Memory Lane Club.

Higgins died from respiratory disease in July 1986, in Los Angeles, at the age of 55.

Discography

As leader
 Extra Soul Perception (Solid State) (1969)
 Heavyweight (United Artists) (1972)
 Little Mama (United Artists) (1972)
 Dance to the Disco Sax (Buddha) (1974)
 Live in MacArthur Park (Buddha) (1975)

As sideman
With Blue Mitchell
Collision in Black (1968)
Bantu Village (1969)
With The Three Sounds
Elegant Soul (1968)
Soul Symphony (1969)
With Gene Harris
The 3 Sounds (1971)

See also
Jazz
Jazz funk
R&B

References

1936 births
1986 deaths
20th-century American businesspeople
20th-century American saxophonists
American funk saxophonists
American male saxophonists
Record producers from Arkansas
American rhythm and blues musicians
Chess Records artists
Respiratory disease deaths in California
People from Conway County, Arkansas
20th-century American male musicians